Bioline may refer to:
 BioLineRx, an Israeli drug development company
 Bioline International , a non-profit publishing cooperative
 Bioline Reagents, a UK company supplying molecular biology products